Enrique Osvaldo Sdrech (1928–2003) was an Argentine writer of Syrian origin. journalist and investigative reporter, best known for his true crime stories.

Works
Esta es mi verdad (1982).
37 puñaladas para Oriel Briant (1986).
El hombre que murió dos veces (1994).
¿Quién mató a Silvia Angélica Cicconi?
Giubileo un caso abierto

References

1928 births
2003 deaths
Argentine people of Syrian descent
Argentine male novelists
Burials at La Chacarita Cemetery
20th-century Argentine novelists
20th-century Argentine male writers
Investigative journalists
Argentine television journalists